North White Junior-Senior High School is a public high school located in Monon, Indiana.

Athletics
North White Junior-Senior High School's athletic teams are the Vikings and they compete in the IHSAA Conference-Independent Schools conference. The school offers a wide range of athletics including:

Baseball
Basketball (Men's and Women's)
Cheerleading
Cross Country
Football (1A state champions 1994)
Soccer (Men's and Women's)
Softball
Track and Field (Men's and Women's)
Volleyball
Wrestling

See also
 List of high schools in Indiana

References

External links
 Official Website

Schools in White County, Indiana
Public middle schools in Indiana
Public high schools in Indiana